Queens is a Polish girl trio formed in February 2005 by Polish Music Agency.  The group is one of the best known girl bands in Poland.  After a minor success with their debut album the group started touring, but illnesses caused several shows to be cancelled. The group was then recast, with only Monika Niedek remaining from the original members. The new lineup's first single, "We Are The Queens", was finally released in early 2007, but the song didn't gain much success. A bit later, when the video was recorded, Queens did a short promotional campaign and decided to take a short break.  After the break, both the whole group and the Polish Music Agency decided to remix and re-release the last single. East Clubbers have mixed the song in 5 different versions. The re-released single also includes a song "Piękne Chwile" (Beautiful Moments), which was the Polish-language version of "We're The Queens".

Members 
 Patrycja Wódz (born 1979) (2005–2006)
 Agnieszka Maksyjan (born 1981) (2005–2006)
 Monika Niedek (born 1983)
 Julia Trębacz (born 1985) (2006-2008)
 Sylwia Parys (born 1988) (2006-2008)

Discography 

2006 - Made For Dancing
"Everybody Loves The Sunshine", 2005
"Od A Do Zet", 2005
"Mija Rok", 2005
"I Fell In Love", 2006
"Każdego Dnia", 2006
2007 - Radio Active
 "No Goodbyes", 2006
"We're The Queens", 2007
"Porywam Cię", 2007
"Ocalić Świat", 2007
Others singles
 "Polska Gra", 2006

External links
 Official website

Polish girl groups
Polish pop music groups
Musical groups established in 2005